is a Japanese author, best known for the creation of Mahoromatic.

Works 
 Ushio and Tora (Novel edition) (1993–1995)
 Dōkyūsei (Novel edition) (1994–1997)
 Yukina no Negai (1999)
 Mahoromatic (Story) (1999–2004)
 Otone no Naisho (Story) (2004)
 Shina Dark (Story) (2006–2009)
 Shiage ni Tate Ari (Story) (2007–2011)

References

External links 
 

 
1964 births
Japanese writers
Living people